Rise Them Up is reggae, dancehall artist Capleton's fifteenth studio album, released on May 15, 2007.

Track listing

	

2007 albums
Capleton albums